The Sultan Ibrahim Ibn Adham Mosque is the largest mosque in the Palestinian town of Beit Hanina, located northeast of Jerusalem. It is named after a Muslim man who lived in the town and worked as collector of olive products. An engraving in a stone in front of the mosque reads, "this mosque was built by Suwaid Abul Hamayel in the year 336 after Hijrah". The area of the mosque was expanded in 1938 by the residents of Beit Hanina. In 1993, a boys primary school was built alongside the mosque.

Sultan Ibrahim Ibn Adham was a famous saint "who renounced a Kingdom and consecrated himself to God" and buried in Jabala Syria.

References

Further reading
Sharon, Moshe (1997):   Corpus Inscriptionum Arabicarum Palaestinae  (Sultan Ibrahim Ibn Adham Mosque:  94  ff.)

Mosques in the West Bank